Eucithara guentheri is a small sea snail, a marine gastropod mollusk in the family Mangeliidae.

Description
The length of the shell attains 25.4 mm, its diameter 10.5 mm. This is the largest species in this genus.

This solid shell with an elongated conical shape has an acuminate apex. Its ground color is white, tinted with red spots and a purple spot on the back. The shell contains 10 angular whorls. It is delicately sculptured with longitudinally ribs, latticed by revolving striae. The aperture is narrow and oblong. The columella is slightly curved and contains a white callus. The outer lip is thickened and has a sharp edge.

Distribution
This marine species is endemic to Australia and occurs off the Northern Territory, Queensland and Western Australia.

References

 Brazier, J. 1876. A list of the Pleurotomidae collected during the Chevert Expedition, with the description of the new species. Proceedings of the Linnean Society of New South Wales 1: 151-162

External links
  Tucker, J.K. 2004 Catalog of recent and fossil turrids (Mollusca: Gastropoda). Zootaxa 682:1-1295
  Petit, R. E. (2009). George Brettingham Sowerby, I, II & III: their conchological publications and molluscan taxa. Zootaxa. 2189: 1–218
  Hedley, C. 1922. A revision of the Australian Turridae. Records of the Australian Museum 13(6): 213-359, pls 42-56
 Kilburn R.N. 1992. Turridae (Mollusca: Gastropoda) of southern Africa and Mozambique. Part 6. Subfamily Mangeliinae, section 1. Annals of the Natal Museum, 33: 461–575

guentheri
Gastropods described in 1893
Gastropods of Australia